Praetorius is a 1965 West German comedy film directed by Kurt Hoffmann and starring Heinz Rühmann, Liselotte Pulver and Fritz Tillmann. The film was shot at the Bavaria Studios in Munich. It was based on a play by Curt Goetz which had previously been turned into the 1950 German film Doctor Praetorius and the 1951 Hollywood film People Will Talk.

Cast
 Heinz Rühmann as Dr. Hiob Prätorius
 Liselotte Pulver as Violetta
 Fritz Tillmann as Dr. Klotz
 Fritz Rasp as Shunderson
 Werner Hinz as Violettas Vater
 Peter Lühr as Professor Speiter
 Klaus Schwarzkopf as Dr. Watzmann
 Käthe Itter as Oberschwester
 Robert Klupp as Rektor
 Marie Ferron
 Tatjana Sais
 Lisa Helwig
 Sigrid Pawlas
 Rosl Mayr as Haushälterin
 Wilhelm Meyer
 Edith Schultze-Westrum
 Sibylle Tewes

References

Bibliography
 Goble, Alan. The Complete Index to Literary Sources in Film. Walter de Gruyter, 1999.

External links 
 

1965 films
1965 comedy films
German comedy films
West German films
1960s German-language films
Films directed by Kurt Hoffmann
German films based on plays
Films based on works by Curt Goetz
Medical-themed films
Remakes of German films
Films shot at Bavaria Studios
1960s German films